The following is a list of prominent Utah musical groups.

A
Acroma, alternative rock band

B
BYU Choirs, classical and modern music
The Backseat Lovers, alternative rock band

C
Chelsea Grin, extreme metal band
Cult Leader, Metal

F
The 5 Browns, classical piano musical group

G
Get Scared, post-hardcore band

I
Imagine Dragons, rock alternative rock and pop
I Dont Know How But They Found Me, alternative and indie rock

K
Katagory V, power metal band

M
Meg & Dia, indie rock band
Michael Barrow & The Tourists, indie folk/rock band

N
The New Transit Direction, indie rock band
Neon Trees, American rock

O
Octappella, contemporary a cappella group
Orchestra at Temple Square, symphony orchestra
The Osmonds, family pop group

P
The Piano Guys, Classic/Pop

R
The Rodeo Boys, folk rock band
Royal Bliss, alternative rock

S
SHeDAISY, country music group
Ryan Shupe & The RubberBand, country music group
Sleepthief, electronic recording project
Stonecircle, fusion group
Swim Herschel Swim,  Ska

T
The Tabernacle Choir at Temple Square, religious and classical music
Tragic Black
The National Parks (Band), American folk pop band
The Clingers, first all-female rock & roll group

U
The Used, rock band
Utah Chamber Artists, classical music orchestra and choir
Utah Festival Opera, opera company
Utah Symphony Orchestra, symphony orchestra
Utah Valley Symphony, symphony orchestra

V
Vocal Point, contemporary a cappella group

Y
Young Ambassadors, song and dance performing group

References

Musical groups
 list of Utah musical groups
Lists of American musicians